Ahmadabad-e Sofla (also Romanized as Aḩmadābād-e Soflá; also known as Aḩmadābād and Aḩmadābād-e Pā’īn) is a village in Ahmadabad Rural District of Takht-e Soleyman District of Takab County, West Azerbaijan province, Iran. At the 2006 National Census, its population was 1,890 in 395 households. The following census in 2011 counted 2,010 people in 496 households. The latest census in 2016 showed a population of 2,046 people in 624 households; it was the largest village in its rural district.

References 

Takab County

Populated places in West Azerbaijan Province

Populated places in Takab County